Kishan Bharvad, a 30-year-old Hindu shopowner, was shot by Shabbir and Imtiaz in the Modhwala locality in the city of Dhandhuka in Gujarat, India on 25 January 2022, and he died on the spot. The 2 accused were arrested by the police. The case is being investigated by the Anti-Terrorism Squad and the National Investigation Agency.

Background 
On 6 January 2022, Kishan had posted a video on social media in which the Hindu deity Krishna was depicted as "superior" to Islamic Prophet Muhammad and Jesus. Shortly after this social media post, there was outrage by some members of Muslim community & a First information report (FIR) was filed on him under the incitement/blasphemy Law 8 days before the murder. He was made to apologize, after which he was released by the police.

Murder 
At 5:30 on 25 January, as Kishan had moved outside his house for the first time since his release from police custody, he was shot by 2 bike-borne assailants later identified as Shabbir and Imtiaz by Gujarat Police. Kishan died on the spot. Later, when the police tried to return the body to the family but they refused and only accepted the body and funeral proposals after meeting Hindu Organization leaders in the area. Leaders from the Antarashtriya Hindu Parishad and Bajrang Dal organized Bandh as a form of protest saying that the Hindu Youth was Martyred.

Investigation 
On 27 January, Maulana Ayyub, a Muslim Cleric, was arrested in Ahmadabad, Gujarat. On 29 January, the Gujarat Government handed this case over to the Anti-Terrorism Squad (ATS) for further investigation. On 30 January, the ATS arrested Maulana Qamar Ghani, a Muslim Cleric, from Daryaganj, Delhi.

On 2 February, the Gujarat ATS invoked the Unlawful Activities (Prevention) Act on both clerics, Ayyub and Qamar Ghani. According to the ATS, Maulana Qamar Ghani runs an Islamic organization called Tehreek Farogh-e Islami. This organization has circulated videos in pasts encouraging Muslim youth to attack non-Muslims who "insult" Islam. On the same day, 3 more people were arrested. Razeem Seta, Hussain Khatri and Matin Modan were arrested for allegedly procuring the weapon and providing food and shelter to the accused.

On 4 February, the National Investigation Agency (NIA) joined the investigation of the murder to investigate the possible terror angle. The ATS denied finding any Pakistani angle in the case.

On 7 February, the ATS released the information that Maulana Ayyub had profiles of 26 individuals in his mobile that might be targeted in the future. On the same day, the 3 main accused were sent in for extra 10 days of remand. According to the ATS, they are currently investigating a list of 10 persons who had allegedly insulted Islam.

On 16 February, Maulana Qamar was sent to judicial custody.

See also 
Murder of Rinku Sharma
Murder of Nikita Tomar
Murder of Kanhaiya Lal
Kamlesh Tiwari

References

Religiously motivated violence in India
January 2022 crimes in Asia
Lynching deaths in India
Ahmedabad district
2022 murders in India
People murdered in Gujarat
Deaths by firearm in India
Islamic terrorism in India
Persecution by Muslims
Violence against Hindus in India
Persecution of Hindus